Küçükdalyan is a town in the central district (Antakya) of Hatay Province, Turkey. At  Küçükdalyan is situated to the east of Asi River (Orontes of the antiquity) and it is almost merged to Antakya. The population of Küçükdalyan was 10354  as of 2019. A part of the town is actually founded in ancient Antiocheia (Antioch) and is officially declared SIT area (Archaeological site). World-famous Church of St Peter is in the municipality of Küçükdalyan. Küçükdalyan was declared as a seat of township in 1994. Major crops of the town are olive, vegetables and fruits.

References

Populated places in Hatay Province
Towns in Turkey
Antakya District